The City of Swan is a local government area of Western Australia. It is in the eastern metropolitan region of Perth and includes the Swan Valley and 42 suburbs. It is centred approximately 20 km north-east of the Perth central business district. The City covers an area of 1,042 km² (which is 19.4% of the Perth Metro area) and had an estimated population of 155,653 in 2020.

32.7% of the City of Swan population was born overseas, compared with 36.1% for Greater Perth.

The largest non-English speaking country of birth in the City of Swan was India, where 3.1% of the population, or 4,163 people, were born.

History 

The City of Swan was formed on 20 February 1970 as the Shire of Swan with the amalgamation of the Shire of Swan-Guildford and the Town of Midland. It assumed its current name when it gained city status on 25 April 2000.

On 1 July 2016 the portion of Noranda north of Widgee Road was transferred to the City of Bayswater.

Wards 
The City of Swan is divided into 5 wards, most of which have three Councillors:

 Altone Ward (3 Councillors)
 Midland/Guildford Ward (3 Councillors)
 Pearce Ward (4 Councillors)
 Swan Valley/Gidgegannup Ward (2 Councillors)
 Whiteman Ward (3 Councillors)

Councillors

Suburbs
The suburbs of the City of Swan with population and size figures based on the most recent Australian census:

( * indicates suburb partially located within City)

Population

Population of antecedent councils

Population of the unified City of Swan

Heritage-listed places

As of 2023, 675 places are heritage-listed in the City of Swan, of which 317 are on the State Register of Heritage Places, among them the Garrick Theatre, Guildford Grammar School Chapel and the Midland Railway Workshops.

References

External links 
 

 
Swan